Bernat Metge (( 1350 – 1410) was a Catalan writer and humanist, best known as the author of Lo Somni, which he wrote from prison (c. 1398), in which Metge discusses the immortality of the soul.

He was a courtier and Secretary for Joan I of Aragon, queen Na Violante, and following some troubles, once more served Martin the Humane of Aragon from 1403 to 1410.

His influences included the literature of Provence, Petrarch, and De vetula, wrongly attributed to Ovid and now sometimes claimed for Richard de Fournival.

He had a profound impact on the Catalan letters and was a catalyst for Italian letters to reach the Iberian Peninsula.

Works
Llibre de Fortuna e Prudència (1381)
Ovidi enamorat
Valter e Griselda (1388)
Apologia (1395)
Lo somni (1399)

Notes

References

External links
 

1340s births
1413 deaths
Writers from Catalonia
Medieval Catalan-language writers
Renaissance humanists
Catalan-language poets
14th-century Spanish poets
People from Barcelona
14th-century Spanish writers
14th-century Catalan people